HMS Strenuous (J338) was a  of the Royal Navy during the Second World War. Originally planned as USS Vital (AM-129), of the United States Navy's , she was transferred to the United Kingdom under Lend-Lease.

Career 
Vital was laid down on 1 January 1942 at Chickasaw, Alabama, by the Gulf Shipbuilding Corp.; launched on 7 September 1942; sponsored by Miss E. Herrmann; and completed on 18 May 1943. Turned over to the Royal Navy under provisions of the lend-lease agreement, Vital was renamed HMS Strenuous (J.338), and subsequently served in the Royal Navy for the duration of World War II.

Returned to the United States Government after the war, on 10 December 1946, the ship resumed her former classification, AM-129, but not her former name. She was carried on the Naval Vessel Register as USS Strenuous (AM-129), and in the 1 January 1947 edition of the Naval Vessel Register merely as AM-129. She was declared surplus on 23 April 1947 and sold by the State Department's Foreign Liquidation Commission to a foreign purchaser. She served in the merchant service until she was broken up for scrap in Germany in July 1956.

References

External links 
 

 

Catherine-class minesweepers
Ships built in Chickasaw, Alabama
1942 ships
World War II minesweepers of the United Kingdom